This is a list of Czech language exonyms for towns located in Germany.

Aachen Cáchy
Altenburg Starohrad
Augsburg Augšpurk
Bad Doberan Dobřany
Bad Kissingen Chýžice
Bad Muskau Mužakov
Bad Schandau Žandov
Bamberg  Bamberk
Bautzen Budyšín
Bayerisch Eisenstein Bavorská Železná Ruda
Bayreuth  Barout
Beeskow Beskov
Berlin Berlín
Bischofswerda  Biskupice 
Brandenburg an der Havel Braniboř
Braunschweig Brunšvik
Bremen Brémy
Bremerhaven Brémský Přístav
Buchloe Buchlov
Bützow Bycov
Calau Kalava
Cham Kouba
Chemnitz Saská Kamenice
Coburg Koburk
Cottbus Chotěbuz
Crimmitschau Křemeničov
Dachau Dachov
Dessau Dessava
Dohna Donín
Dresden Drážďany
Erlangen Erlanky
Flöha Vlha
Furth im Wald Brod nad Lesy
Glauchau Hluchov
Göppingen Gopinky
Görlitz Zhořelec
Göttingen Gotinky
Guben Hubno
Hamburg Hamburk
Hanau Hanava
Herrnhut Ochranov
Hoyerswerda Hojeřice
Ilmenau Ilmenava
Kamenz Kamenec
Koblenz Koblenec
Köln Kolín nad Rýnem
Köpenick Kopník
Königstein Králův Kámen
Konstanz Kostnice
Leipzig Lipsko
Lindau Lindava
Linz am Rhein Linec nad Rýnem
Löbau Lubij
Lübben (Spreewald) Lubín
Lübbenau Lubínov
Lübeck Lubek
Luckau Lukov
Mainz Mohuč
Marburg Marburk
Marktredwitz Ředvice
Meerane Morany
Meißen Míšeň
Merseburg Meziboř
Mühlberg an der Elbe Milberk
München Mnichov
Nauen Navno
Neubrandenburg Nový Braniboř
Neustadt an der Waldnaab Nové Město nad Nábou
Neustrelitz Nové Střelice
Niesky Nizký
Nürnberg Norimberk
Oelsnitz (Vogtland) Olešnice nad Halštrovem
Oelsnitz (Erzgebirge) Saská Olešnice
Oldenburg Oldenburk
Oranienburg Bocov
Oschatz Ožice
Oybin Ojvin
Passau Pasov
Peitz Picno
Pirna Perno
Plauen Plavno
Potsdam Postupim
Prenzlau Přemyslav
Quedlinburg Kvedlinburk
Rathenow Ratenov
Regen Řezen
Regensburg Řezno
Riesa Řezov
Rostock Roztoky
Schleswig Šlesvik
Schlettau Slatina
Schweinfurt Svinibrod
Schwerin Zvěřín
Speyer Špýr
Straubing Štrubina
Strehla Střela
Stuttgart Štutgart
Torgau Torgov
Trier Trevír
Tübingen Tubinky
Usedom Uznojm
Waldsassen Valdsasy
Wangen im Allgäu Vanky
Weida Vejda
Weimar Výmar
Wolgast Bolehošt'
Würzburg Vircpurk
Zeitz Žíč
Zerbst Srbiště
Zittau Žitava
Zschopau Čopava
Zwickau Cvikov
Zwiesel Svízel

See also

Czech exonyms
List of European exonyms

Czech
Czech language
Czech
Czech exonyms for places in Germany